Sinhagad is an ancient  hill fortress located at around 49 km southwest of the city of Pune, India. 

Previously known as Kondhana, the fort had been the site of many battles, most notably the Battle of Sinhagad in 1670. 

It is Located near the Pune district in Maharashtra. The fort is also on the famous fort in Maharashtra which has a great history of Tanaji Malusare. The fort was captured by Tanaji Malusare and his brother. Sinhagad (Lion's Fort) fort was strategically built to provide natural protection from the enemies due to its very steep slopes. The walls  of the forts and bastions were constructed only at key places. There are two gates  to enter the fort named Kalyan Darwaja and Pune Darwaza. The Kalyan Darwaja is towards the southeast while the Pune Darwaza is towards north east. This fort is also called as center fort of Maratha empire as it is surrounded by many forts beside. During the clear climate you can see Rajgad, Purandar and Torna forts from the Sinhagad killa.

Geography
Perched on an isolated cliff of the Bhuleswar range in the Sahyadri Mountains, the fort is situated on a hill about 760 metres above ground and 1,312 metres above mean sea level.

History

Early history
Some of the information available about the fort, suggests that it could have been built 2000 years ago. The caves and the carvings in the Kaundinyeshwar temple stand as proofs for the same.. Also there is a Gondwana state symbol on the main gate of the fort. It has the sign of lion and elephant as well as fish. The Raj Gondian According to the Deccan sultanates era muslim historian Ferishta,  Sinhagad fort was captured from Koli chieftain Nag Nayak in 1340 by the sultan of Delhi, Muhammad bin Tughluq .

The Sinhagad Fort was initially known as "Kondhana" after the sage Kaundinya. The Kaundinyeshwar temple coupled with the caves and carvings indicates that the fort had probably been built around two thousand years ago.

The fort was captured by forces of Muhammad bin Tughluq in 1328  from Koli chieftain Nag Naik after a siege of eight months. It then became part of the Bahmani sultanate followed by the Nizam Shahi of Ahmadnagar in 1485.After the fall of Nizam shahi it came under the control of the Adilshahi in early late 1500s.

Battle for control in 17th century

Shahaji Bhosale, as the commander of Ibrahim Adil Shah II, was entrusted with the control of the Pune region. His son Chatrapati Shivaji Maharaj, refused to accept the Adilshahi and initiated the task of setting up Swarajya. Chatrapati Shivaji Maharaj gained control of Kondana in 1647 by convincing Siddi Amber, the Adilshahi Sardar who controlled the fort, that he, the son of Shahaji Bhosale, could manage the fort's defenses optimally. Bapuji Mudgal Deshpande played a key role in this activity. Adil Shah jailed Siddi Amber for this treasonous act and schemed to get it back. He imprisoned Shahaji Bhosale for a concocted crime and informed Shivaji. In 1649, Adil Shah traded the fort for Shahaji's release. Chatrapati Shivaji Maharaj recaptured it in 1656 again with the help of Bapuji Mudgal Deshpande who convinced the Fort commander by giving land in the newly created Khed Shivapur village and peacefully gained control of the fort.
This fort saw attacks by Mughals in 1662, 1663, and 1665. In 1664, Shaista Khan, a Mughal general, tried to bribe the people of the fort to hand it over to him but was unsuccessful.Through the Treaty of Purandar in 1665, that Chatrapati Shivaji Maharaj entered into with Mughal general Mirza Raja Jai Singh I the fort passed into the Mughal hands.

Battle of Sinhagad

In 1670, Chatrapati Shivaji Maharaj reconquered the fort for the third time through his Koli Subedar, Tanaji Malusare in Battle of Sinhagad, and the fort came and stayed under the Maratha rule till 1689 A.D.

A steep cliff leading to the fort was scaled in the dead of the night with the help of a tamed monitor lizard named "Yashwanti", colloquially known as a Ghorpad. Thereafter, A fierce battle ensued between Tanaji and his men versus the Mughal army headed by Udaybhan Singh Rathod, a Rajput Sardar who had control of the fort. Tanaji Malusare lost his life, but his brother Suryaji took over and captured the Kondana fort, now known as Sinhagad.

There is an anecdote that upon hearing of Tanaji's death, Shivaji expressed his remorse with the words, "Gad ala, pan Sinha gela" - "The Fort is conquered, but the Lion was lost".According to some, the name Sinhagad predates this event. A bust of Tanaji Malusare was established on the fort in memory of his contribution to the battle.

After the death of Sambhaji, the Mughals regained control of the fort. The Marathas headed by "Sardar Balkawade", recaptured it in 1693. Rajaram I took asylum in this fort during a Mogul raid on Satara. He died at the Fort on 3 March 1700 A.D.
In 1703, Aurangzeb conquered the fort. In 1706, it once again went into the hands of the Maratha's. Panaji Shivdev of Sangola, Visaji Chafer, and Shankar Narayan,the Pant Sachiv played a key role in this battle.

Peshwa era 
The fort remained under Maratha's rule till the year 1817.The more than one century of the Peshwa rule saw the fort serving as a refuge from hostile forces attacking Pune, or as a place of confinement for rebels. In 1817 the East India Company, general Pritzler laid siege to the fort on the orders of Mountstuart Elphinstone, the company resident in Pune at the end of Third Anglo-Maratha War and it passed into the British hands.

Culture and Tourism

The Fort is a popular weekend destination for many residents of Pune, including trekking enthusiasts with access to the top of the fort from the base of the Sinhagad village. The trek involves a one-way walk of 2.7 km (1.6 miles) over which the walker gains about 600 m (1950 feet) in elevation.

Parts of the once extensive fortification are in ruins. The fort houses a memorial to Tanaji as well as the tomb of Rajaram I. Visitors can see the military stables, a brewery and a temple of the goddess Kali (goddess) along with a Hanuman statue to the right side of the temple, as well as the historic gates. The original commemorative memorial of Tanaji Malusare has been unearthed by the restoration workers at Sinhagad Fort in Feb 2019. The stone structure was found buried under cement, concrete, and layers of oil paint and is believed to be around 350 years old.

Sinhagad Fort has played a vital role in India's freedom struggle. Bal Gangadhar Tilak also known as 'The Father of Indian Unrest', used the fort as a summer retreat. It is here where Mahatma Gandhi after his return from South Africa had a historic meeting with Tilak. The bungalow has his bust at the entrance.

The fort also houses a television tower for broadcasting local TV signals. Currently, Non-Vegetarian food, Partying including alcoholic beverages and smoking is banned on the fort.

Pune Mahanagar Parivahan Mahamandal Limited (PMPML) runs a bus service (bus number 50) from Shaniwar Wada to the Sinhagad foothills (Sinhagad Payatha). The climbing route from either side of the fort can be covered in an hour. Shared taxi services to the base as well as the top of the fort are also available.

See also
 List of forts in Maharashtra
 Sinhagad Express
 Nag Nayak of Sinhagad
 Sinhagad Fort Pune

References

Buildings and structures of the Maratha Empire
Tourist attractions in Pune
Forts in Pune district